Mori Tower may refer to:
Roppongi Hills Mori Tower, a 54-story skyscraper
 Atago Green Hills MORI Tower, a 42-story skyscraper
Holland Hills Mori Tower
Ark Hills Sengokuyama Mori Tower
Toranomon Hills Mori Tower, a 52-story skyscraper
Jakarta Mori Tower

Mori Building